Stephen W. Porges (born 1945) is an American psychologist and neuroscientist. He is the Professor of Psychiatry at the University of North Carolina at Chapel Hill. Porges is also currently Director of the Kinsey Institute Traumatic Stress Research Consortium at Indiana University Bloomington, which studies trauma. He was previously a professor at the University of Illinois, Chicago, where he was director of the Brain-Body Center at the College of Medicine, and at the University of Maryland.

He proposed the unproven polyvagal theory in 1994. 
It is popular among some clinical practitioners and patients, but is not endorsed by current social neuroscience.

He is today a neuroscientist with particular interests in cranial nerve responses as it relates to both animals and man in which there are specified responses that are physiological in the body.

Research Focus

Polyvagal theory is a collection of unproven evolutionary, neuroscientific, and psychological constructs pertaining to the role of the vagus nerve in emotion regulation, social connection and fear response. It focuses on the autonomic antecedents of behavior, including an appreciation of the autonomic nervous system as a system, the identification of neural circuits involved in the regulation of autonomic states, and the interpretation of autonomic reactivity as adaptive within the context of the phylogeny of the vertebrate autonomic nervous system. Foremost, the polyvagal perspective emphasizes the importance of phylogenetic changes in the neural structures regulating the heart and phylogenetic shifts providing insight into the adaptive function of both physiology and behavior. The theory emphasizes the phylogenetic emergence of two vagal systems: a potentially lethal ancient brain and cord circuits involved in defensive strategies of immobilization (e.g., fainting, freezing, fighting) including dissociative states. Polyvagal responses provided a new conceptualization of the autonomic nervous system that emphasize neurophysiological mechanisms and phylogenetic shifts in the neural regulation of the psychological responses from the cranial nerves to the spine, spinal cord and lower aspects of the mammalian brain.

He is a former president of the Society for Psychophysiological Research and has been president of the Federation of Behavioral, Psychological and Cognitive Sciences (now called the Federation of Associations in Behavioral & Brain Sciences), a consortium of societies representing approximately twenty-thousand biobehavioral scientists.

He was a recipient of a National Institute of Mental Health Research Scientist Development award. He has chaired the National Institute of Child Health and Human Development, maternal and child health research committee and was a visiting scientist in the National Institute of Child Health and Human Development Laboratory of Comparative Ethology.

Professional societies
 Academy of Behavioral Medicine Research
 American Psychological Association
 Association for Psychological Science
 International Society for Infant Studies
 Society for Psychophysiological Research
 Society for Research in Child Development
 International Behavioral Neuroscience Society

Editorial duties
 Psychophysiology (1983–1987)
 Infant Behavior and Development (1977–1992)
 Child Development
 Developmental Psychobiology (1985–1991, 1995–1999)
 Journal of Applied Developmental Psychology (1993–1998)
 Developmental Review (2000–2006)

Selected works
 Porges SW. (1992). Vagal Tone: A physiological marker of stress vulnerability. Pediatrics 90:498–504.
 Porges SW. (1995). Cardiac vagal tone: A physiological index of stress. Neuroscience and Biobehavioral Reviews 19:225–233.
 Porges SW.  (1995). Orienting in a defensive world: Mammalian modifications of our evolutionary heritage. A Polyvagal Theory. Psychophysiology 32:301–318.
 Porges SW. (1996). Physiological regulation in high-risk infants: A model for assessment and potential intervention. Development and Psychopathology 8:43–58.
 Porges SW. (1998). Love: An emergent property of the mammalian autonomic nervous system. Psychoneuroendocrinology 23:837–861.
 Porges SW. (2001). The Polyvagal Theory: Phylogenetic substrates of a social nervous system. International Journal of Psychophysiology 42:123–146.
 Porges SW. (2003). The Polyvagal Theory: Phylogenetic contributions to social behavior. Physiology and Behavior 79:503–513.
 Porges SW. (2003). Social engagement and attachment: A phylogenetic perspective.  Roots of Mental Illness in Children, Annals of the New York Academy of Sciences 1008:31–47.
 Porges SW. (2004). Neuroception: A subconscious system for detecting threat and safety. Zero to Three: Bulletin of the National Center for Clinical Infant Programs 24:5,19–24.
 Porges SW. (2005). The vagus: A mediator of behavioral and visceral features associated with autism.  In ML Bauman and TL Kemper, eds. The Neurobiology of Autism. Baltimore: Johns Hopkins University Press, 65–78.
 Porges SW. (2006). Asserting the role of biobehavioral sciences in translational research: The behavioral neurobiology revolution. Developmental Psychopathology 18:923–933.
 Porges SW. (2007). The polyvagal perspective. Biological Psychology 74:116–143.
 Porges SW. (2009). The polyvagal theory: New insights into adaptive reactions of the autonomic nervous system. Cleveland Clinic Journal of Medicine, 76:S86–90.
 Porges SW. (2009). Reciprocal influences between body and brain in the perception and expression of affect: A polyvagal perspective. In D Fosha, D Siegel, and M Solomon, eds. The Healing Power of Emotion: Affective Neuroscience, Development, and Clinical Practice. New York: Norton, 27–54.
 Porges SW, Lewis GF. (2009). The polyvagal hypothesis: Common mechanisms mediating autonomic regulation, vocalizations, and listening.  In SM Brudzynski, ed. Handbook of Mammalian Vocalizations: An Integrative Neuroscience Approach.  Amsterdam: Academic Press, 255–264.
 Porges SW, Furman SA. (2011). The early development of the autonomic nervous system provides a neural platform for social behavior: A polyvagal perspective. Infant and Child Development 20:106–118.
 Porges SW, Carter CS. (2011). Neurobiology and evolution: Mechanisms, mediators, and adaptive consequences of caregiving. In SL Brown, RM Brown, and LA Penner, eds. Self Interest and Beyond: Toward a New Understanding of Human Caregiving.  New York: Oxford University Press, 53–71.
 Heilman KJ, Harden E., Zageris D, Berry-Kravis E, Porges SW (2011). Autonomic regulation in Fragile X Syndrome. Developmental Psychobiology 53:785–795.
 Heilman KJ, Connolly SD, Padilla WO, Wrzosek MI, Graczyk PA, Porges SW (2012).  Sluggish vagal brake reactivity to physical challenge in children with selective mutism. Development and Psychopathology, 24: 241–250.
 Porges SW, Macellaio M, Stanfill SD, McCue K, Lewis GF, Harden ER, Handelman M, Denver J, Bazhenova OV, Heilman KJ. (2013). Respiratory sinus arrhythmia and auditory processing in autism: Modifiable deficits of an integrated social engagement system? International Journal of Psychophysiology 88: 261–270.
 Heilman KJ, Harden ER, Weber KM, Cohen M, Porges SW. (2013). Atypical autonomic regulation, auditory processing, and affect recognition in women with HIV. Biological Psychology 94:143–151.
 Williamson JB, Heilman KM, Porges EC, Lamb DG, Porges SW (2013). Possible mechanism for PTSD symptoms in patients with traumatic brain injury: central autonomic network disruption. Frontiers in Neuroengineering. 
 Carter CS, Porges SW. (2013). The biochemistry of love: an oxytocin hypothesis. EMBO Reports. 2013 Jan 3;14(1):12–16. . Epub 2012 Nov 27.

Books
 Porges SW, Coles MGH, eds. (1976).  Psychophysiology.  Stroudsburg, PA: Dowden, Hutchinson & Ross.
 Coles MGH, Donchin E, Porges SW, eds.  (1986). Psychophysiology:  Systems, Processes & Applications.  New York:  Guilford.
 Carter CS, Ahnert L, Grossmann K, Hrdy SB, Lamb ME, Porges SW, Sachser N, eds. (2005) Attachment and Bonding: A New Synthesis. Cambridge: MIT Press.
 Porges SW, Dominguez-Trejo B, Martinez AC. (2005).  La Teoria Polivagal.  Mexico, Universidad Nacional Autonoma de Mexico, Comision Nacional de los Derechos Humanos. 
 Porges SW (2010).  Die Polyvagal-Theorie: Neurophysiologische Grundlagen der Therapie. Paderborn, Germany: Junfermann Verlag.
 Porges SW (2011).  The Polyvagal Theory: Neurophysiological Foundations of Emotions, Attachment, Communication, and Self-regulation.  New York: WW Norton.
 Porges SW (2017).  Pocket Guide to the Polyvagal Theory – The Transformative Power of Feeling Safe. WW Norton & Co.
 Porges SW (2021). Polyvagal Safety: Attachment, Communication, Self-Regulation. New York: W. W. Norton & Company

References

External links
 Stephen Porges web page
 

21st-century American psychologists
Living people
1945 births
University of Illinois Chicago faculty
Michigan State University alumni
20th-century American psychologists